Cataglyphis iberica is a species of desert ant found in the Iberian Peninsula. It was described by Carlo Emery in 1906.

References

Further reading

 
 
 
 

Taxa named by Carlo Emery
Insects described in 1906
Formicinae
Hymenoptera of Europe
Endemic insects of the Iberian Peninsula